Northolt High School is a secondary school located in the Northolt area of the London Borough of Ealing, England.

Admissions
The school accepts students between the age of 11 to 18. The school has a total of 1401 students.

It is situated on the northern edge of the borough of Ealing, near to the intersection of the boroughs of Ealing, Harrow and Hillingdon. It is north-west of Northolt town centre.

History

Grammar school and Secondary Modern
Northolt High School was established in 1974 as a combination of Vincent Secondary Modern (est. 1953) and Eliots Green Grammar school (Est 1956) which were adjacent to each other on Eastcote Lane in Northolt.

Comprehensive school
It became a comprehensive in 1974.

The school was featured in a documentary series called The Choir, on the BBC during December, 2006. The choir director, Gareth Malone, was at the school from November 2005 to July 2006, before taking the choir to China, to compete in the World Choir Games.

Buildings
In November 2005 the school began constructing a £1.5 million Sports Hall that was completed in November 2006 and opened in January 2007. The Sports Hall is a community facility offering a range of sport and leisure activities.  It is managed through a partnership between Northolt High School and Active Ealing. The school also has a CLC and an astroturf pitch and a renovated Sixth Form Centre, opened in 2007.

Information 
Northolt High School is based on Eastcote Lane.
 The nearest railway station Northolt tube station
 The 282 and 395 buses stop outside of the school, and the 120, 140 and 90 buses stop at Northolt tube station, a five-minute walk from the school. The E10 bus stops at Islip Manor Park
, also a few minutes walk from the school; it is situated close to Notholt Underground Station.

Notable former pupils

Eliots Green Grammar School
 Andrew King FRS, neurophysiologist
 Steve Perryman, football player
 General Sir John Reith CBE, former Deputy Supreme Allied Commander Europe

Northolt High School
Entertainment/media/creative:
Kerry Godliman - comedian and actor.
Katie Hillier - fashion designer
Adam Hamdy - novelist, screenwriter and producer
Rahul Kohli - actor
 Andy Miller - guitarist, Dodgy
Sports:
Danny Hutchins, football player
 Karleigh Osborne, football player
 Kieron Forbes, football player
 Jerome Okimo, football player
 Oliver Hawkins, football player

References

External links 
 
 OFSTED Report
 Former school
 EduBase

Secondary schools in the London Borough of Ealing
Educational institutions established in 1956
1956 establishments in England
Foundation schools in the London Borough of Ealing
Northolt